The voting pencil conspiracy theory is a  conspiracy theory that using the pencils provided in British polling stations allows the result to be changed by MI5. Promoters of the theory urge people to use pen on the basis that it makes it harder for MI5 to change the vote. The theory originated with "Yes" voters in the 2014 Scottish independence referendum and was widespread among "Leave" voters during the 2016 United Kingdom European Union membership referendum. On Twitter the hashtags #Usepens and #Pencilgate were used to promote the theory. Legally, voters are free to use the pencil or bring their own pen.

The conspiracy theory later spread beyond the UK and featured in the 2022 Australian federal election.

References

Conspiracy theories in the United Kingdom
Electoral fraud in the United Kingdom
Pencils